Thevenard (postcode 5690) is a port town in the far west of Eyre Peninsula, South Australia. It is contiguous with the larger town of Ceduna. Its name derives from nearby Cape Thevenard, which in turn was named after Antoine-Jean-Marie Thévenard, a French admiral.

The port handles bulk grain, gypsum, salt and zircon. Thevenard is a terminus of the privately operated Lake MacDonnell–Thevenard railway, which delivers three trains of bulk gypsum daily from the Lake MacDonnell mine,  to the west. Production from the mine, owned by Gypsum Resources Australia, is about 3.5 million tonnes (3.4 million long tons) per year.

Thevenard is in the District Council of Ceduna local government area, the South Australian House of Assembly electoral district of Flinders and the Australian House of Representatives Division of Grey.

Greek immigration to Thevenard, especially by people in the fishing industry, has been important in shaping the town's culture. Greeks from Thevenard are believed to have introduced eating barramundi to Anglo-Celtic Australians.

External links
Ceduna Online

References

Coastal towns in South Australia
Eyre Peninsula
Ports and harbours of South Australia